Mauricio Zeilic (born circa 1947) is a Cuban-American show business reporter.

A paparazzo for more than a decade, Zeilic was one of the five hosts of Cotorreando, a show dedicated to talking about the lives of movie and music stars.
Zeilic has earned various awards during his career as a reporter. He has appeared together with some of his co-hosts in commercials for Sears and Motorola.

Host Luisa Fernanda left the show "Cotorreando" in June 2007. The show ran until September 28, 2007 when it was cancelled by Telemundo.

References

External links
Cottoreando Official Site
See also: Esteban Arce

1929 births
Living people
American people of Cuban descent
American television reporters and correspondents